Festninga Mountain is a broad, ice-topped mountain,  high, standing west of Mount Hochlin at the west end of the Mühlig-Hofmann Mountains, in Queen Maud Land, Antarctica. it was mapped by Norwegian cartographers from surveys and air photos by the Sixth Norwegian Antarctic Expedition (1956–60) and named Festninga (the fortress). Austvollen Bluff forms the east side of the mountain.

See also
Vestvollen Bluff

References 

Mountains of Queen Maud Land
Princess Martha Coast